600 Hours of Edward is a 2009 novel by Craig Lancaster, about Edward, a man with Asperger syndrome. As the title implies, the novel is about six hundred separate hours in Edward's life, as recorded in his journal.

Story
Edward lives a rigidly ordered life in Billings, Montana, which usually culminates in watching an episode of the police procedural drama Dragnet on old VHS tapes every night. Any deviation from this routine upsets him.

Occasionally he meets with a counselor, but he is an unemployed man.

The sequel Edward Adrift follows on where the story leaves off.

Awards
2009 Montana Honor Book
2010 High Plains Award recipient, “Best First Book,” 600 Hours of Edward

References

External links
 Review 121: 600 Hours of Edward by Craig Lancaster
 Two Novelists’ Love/Hate Relationship with Social Media (discusses 600 Hours of Edward)

Novels by Craig Lancaster
2009 American novels
Books about autism
Novels set in Montana